Heaven Official's Blessing (Chinese: 天官赐福, pinyin: Tiān Guān Cì Fú) is a Chinese novel series written by Mo Xiang Tong Xiu (Chinese: 墨香铜臭). A donghua series adaptation was first released on Bilibili and Funimation on 31 October 2020 and received a positive review and recommendation by CBR. It consists of 244 chapters and an additional five stories in eight chapters that take place post-canon. The last novel number 6, was published on 7 March 2022. There also exists a manhua based on the novel, illustrated by STARember and published by Bilibili, with 83 chapters as of 13 October 2022. It has been collected into 2 published volumes as of 18 July 2022.

Synopsis
Eight hundred years ago, Xie Lian was the Crown Prince of the Xian Le kingdom. He was loved by his citizens and was considered the darling of the world. He ascended to the Heavens at a young age; however, due to unfortunate circumstances, was quickly banished back to the mortal realm. Years later, he ascends again–only to be banished again a few minutes after his ascension.

Now, eight hundred years later, Xie Lian ascends to the Heavens for the third time as the laughing stock among all three realms. On his first task as a god thrice ascended, he meets a mysterious ghost who rules the ghosts and terrifies the Heavens, yet, unbeknownst to Xie Lian, this ghost king has been paying attention to him for a very, very long time.

Plot

Novel
Though not chronologically, the novel follows the life of Xie Lian, a once human crown prince of the Kingdom of Xianle in the east who ascends to godhood at seventeen after dedicating himself to cultivation and martial training. During the inaugural years of his divinity, his kingdom experiences upheaval and war, due in part to drought and a terrifying new disease. Going against the edicts of both the heavenly realm and of fate, Xie Lian involves himself in the affairs of the mortals who have always loved and supported him, hoping to achieve peace and relieve suffering in his kingdom. Unfortunately, his appearance in the mortal world only amplifies the conflicts between his people, and their desperation leads to the dramatic and abrupt downfall of Xianle, as well as the downfall of Xie Lian. The people destroy his temples, statues, and shrines, abandoning him as their most respected religious figure and earning him the reputation of a God of Misfortune.

Much later in his immortal life, after being banished twice by the Emperor of the Heavenly Realm, Xie Lian again ascends to the heavens to work as a godly official. Now known as a peculiar, peripatetic scrap-collector with perennially bad luck, Xie Lian is ridiculed or ignored by most other heavenly officials. Nevertheless, he retains his good-hearted nature and only wishes to fulfill his duties as a god.

For Xie Lian's first assignment of his third ascension, he is tasked with solving the mystery of a number of brides who have disappeared during their wedding processions through Mount Yujun in the mortal world. During his investigation, he is unexpectedly greeted by a ghost whose form resembles that of a young man wearing maple-red robes and silver vambraces, with black boots and attached silver chains. Silver butterflies and a rain of blood also accompany the first appearance of the youthful ghost. He interacts with Xie Lian only to briefly guide him in his mission, by taking his hand and walking with him through Mount Yujun, simultaneously breaking an enchantment array on the mountain that was preventing Xie Lian from detecting the culprit of the disappearances. After his completion of the assignment, bemused by an encounter he describes as "oddly charming to the extreme," Xie Lian learns from heaven that he had encountered Hua Cheng, or Crimson Rain Sought Flower (血雨探花), one of four fearsome ghost kings known as the Four Great Calamities.

Heedless of warnings to stay away from Hua Cheng, Xie Lian continues to cross paths with the nonchalant and intelligent ghost king as he becomes increasingly enveloped in the affairs of the three realms of heaven, earth, and ghost. Their interactions gradually lead to the building of a close, mutually protective relationship. As he unravels his feelings for Hua Cheng, and as Hua Cheng establishes himself as a steady fixture in his life, Xie Lian is yet to realize just how long their pasts have been entwined.

Translation
The novels are being officially translated into English by Seven Seas Entertainment with eight volumes in total. The first was released on December 14, 2021 and volume 5 was released December 20, 2022.

Origin
Regarding her conception of the story, Mo Xiang Tong Xiu has said:

Adaptations

Donghua
The donghua was released on Bilibili and Funimation in October 2020. The production of a second season was confirmed by Bilibili in January 2021. A special episode was released on February 16, 2021. Netflix also began streaming the series (including the special episode) as of April 9, 2021.

The English dub premiered on November 12, 2021 on Funimation.

Episodes

Live-action
A live-action series, Eternal Faith, began production in 2021. Chen Jialin will direct the series.

Characters

Main characters
Xie Lian 谢怜 (The Crown Prince, God-Pleasing Crown Prince, Flower-Crowned Martial God, Scrap Immortal)

Protagonist. A very unlucky god who collects scraps for a living.
Voiced by: Jiang Guangtao (donghua), Hiroshi Kamiya (Japanese dub), Park Yohan (Korean dub), Howard Wang (English dub), Non Sepho (Thai Dub)

Hua Cheng 花城 (Crimson Rain Sought Flower 血雨探花, San Lang 三郎)

Main character and love interest. A ghost king known as the terror of the heavens. One of the Four Calamities.
Voiced by: Ma Zhengyang (donghua), Jun Fukuyama (Japanese dub), Jeong Joo-won (Korean dub), James Cheek (English dub), Sakarach Amsom (Thai Dub)

Heavenly Court
Jun Wu 君吾

The Heavenly Emperor of the Upper Court. The most powerful martial god.

Ling Wen 灵文

A civil goddess who provides information on assignments through a spiritual communication array. 
Voiced by: Huang Ying (donghua), Yoko Hikasa (Japanese dub), Kim Bo-na (Korean dub), Wendee Lee (English dub)

Shi Wudu 师无渡 (Lord Water Master, The Water Tyrant)
The elemental master of water. Elder brother of Shi Qingxuan.

Shi Qingxuan 师青玄 (Lord Wind Master, Lady Wind Master)
Voiced by (female form): Qiu Qiu (donghua), Ayako Kawasumi (Japanese dub), Anjali Kunapaneni (English dub)
Voiced by (male form): Lu Zhixing (donghua)
The elemental master of wind. Younger sibling of Shi Wudu.

Ming Yi 明仪 (Lord Earth Master, Lady Earth Master)
The elemental master of earth.

Yushi Huang 雨师篁 (Rain Master)
The elemental master of rain.

Feng Xin 风信 (General Nan Yang 南阳真君)

The martial god of the southeast. Was in service of Xie Lian when he was still prince of Xianle.
Voiced by: Wen Sen (donghua)

Nan Feng 南风

A Middle Court junior official from the palace of General Nan Yang.
Voiced by: Wen Sen (donghua), Makoto Furukawa (Japanese dub), Choi Seung-hun (Korean dub), Phil Song (English dub)

Mu Qing 慕情 (General Xuan Zhen 玄真将军)

The martial god of the southwest. Was also in service of Xie Lian when he was still prince of Xianle.
Voiced by: Hu Liangwei (donghua)

Fu Yao 扶摇

A Middle Court junior official from the palace of General Xuan Zhen.
Voiced by: Hu Liangwei (donghua), Chiaki Kobayashi (Japanese dub), Nam Doh-hyeong (Korean dub), Lucien Dodge (English dub)

Pei Ming 裴茗 (General Ming Guang, General Pei)
The martial god of the north.
Voiced by: Tu Xiongfei (donghua), Junichi Suwabe (Japanese dub), Aaron Campbell (English dub)

Pei Su 裴宿 (Little Pei, A-Zhao)

A martial god and an indirect descendant of Pei Ming.
Voiced by: Ling Fei (donghua), Toshiki Masuda (Japanese dub), Aaron Campbell (English dub)

Quan Yizhen 权一真 (Qi Ying)
The martial god of the west.

Lang Qianqiu 郎千秋 (Prince Tai Hua)
The current martial god of the east.

Calamities
White No-Face/Bai Wuxiang 白无相 (White-Clothed Calamity 白衣祸世)
The main antagonist of the story. The eldest and the most powerful of the Four Great Calamities. He is the one responsible for the fall of the kingdom of Xianle.

He Xuan 贺玄 (Ship-Sinking Black Water 黑水沉舟)
One of the Four Calamities. A powerful water demon.

Qi Rong 戚容 (Night-Touring Green Lantern 青灯夜游, Green Ghost)
One of the Four Calamities. Ranks as a Savage, one step behind the other three Calamities ranking of Supreme.

Banyue 半月

A Savage-ranked female ghost. Former Guoshi of Banyue Kingdom.
Voiced by: Tao Dian (donghua), Kana Hanazawa (Japanese dub), Emi Lo (English dub)

Xuan Ji 宣姬

A Wrath-ranked female ghost. A former lover of Pei Ming before he ascended to the heavens.
Voiced by: Shan Xin (donghua), Yuko Kaida (Japanese dub), Michelle Rojas (English dub)

Spiritual devices
Ruoye 若邪

Xie Lian's spiritual device. A sentient strip of white silk.

E'ming 厄命

Hua Cheng's spiritual device. A sentient scimitar.

Notes

References

External links
 Official Website 
 Heaven Official's Blessing at Funimation

2020 Chinese television series debuts
2020s LGBT-related television series
Animated series based on novels
Aniplex
Chinese animated television series
Chinese boys' love television series
Chinese web series
Funimation
Haoliners Animation League
Heaven in popular culture
LGBT-related animated series
Mandarin-language television shows
Seven Seas Entertainment titles
Xianxia television series